Ivan Zoroski (born on July 24, 1979) is a retired Serbian professional basketball player. Standing at 1.97 m (6 ft 5  in) he played at the point guard and shooting guard positions.

Professional career
In his professional career Zoroski has played for the following clubs: FMP Železnik of the Adriatic League (2000–04), the big Greek Euroleague club Olympiacos Piraeus (2004–05), Dynamo Moscow Region of the Russian Superleague A (2005–06), the Belgian League club Spirou Charleroi (2006), Valladolid of the Spanish ACB League (2006–07), the Greek A1 League club Panionios (2007–10), and the Italian League clubs Teramo Basket, Sutor Montegranaro and Umana Reyer Venezia.

National team career
Zoroski played with the junior national team of Yugoslavia and he won the gold medal at the 2001 World University Games.

References

External links
 Ivan Zoroski at abaliga.com
 Ivan Zoroski at acb.com
 Ivan Zoroski at euroleague.net
 Ivan Zoroski at eurobasket.com
 Ivan Zoroski at fiba.com

1979 births
Living people
ABA League players
CB Valladolid players
Greek Basket League players
KK FMP (1991–2011) players
Liga ACB players
Olympiacos B.C. players
Panionios B.C. players
Point guards
Reyer Venezia players
Serbian expatriate basketball people in Belgium
Serbian expatriate basketball people in Greece
Serbian expatriate basketball people in Italy
Serbian expatriate basketball people in Russia
Serbian expatriate basketball people in Spain
Serbian men's basketball players
Shooting guards
Spirou Charleroi players
Sutor Basket Montegranaro players
Teramo Basket players
Universiade medalists in basketball
Universiade gold medalists for Yugoslavia
Medalists at the 2001 Summer Universiade